There is no county-wide local education authority in Northamptonshire, instead education services are provided by the two smaller unitary authorities of North Northamptonshire and West Northamptonshire:

 List of schools in North Northamptonshire
 List of schools in West Northamptonshire